The women's 3000 meter at the 2020 KNSB Dutch Single Distance Championships in Heerenveen took place at Thialf ice skating rink on Saturday 28 December 2019.

Statistics

Result

Source:

Referee: Frank Zwitser. Assistant: Suzan van den Belt  Starter: Peter van Muiswinkel 
Start: 16:58 hr. Finish: 17:39 hr.

Draw

References 

Single Distance Championships
2020 Single Distance
World